The 2009–10 Stanford Cardinal men's basketball team represented Stanford University during the 2009–10 NCAA Division I men's basketball season. The Cardinal were led by second year head coach Johnny Dawkins, and played their home games at Maples Pavilion as a member of the Pacific-10 Conference.

Previous season
The Cardinal started the year off strong starting 10–0 in non-conference play, but couldn't keep up in conference play ending up under .500. In the Pac-10 tournament they received a 9 seed and would win in the first round against Oregon State and would face the #1 seed Washington and would lose 73–85. Stanford received a bid to the College Basketball Invitational as a #1 seed in the Midwest and a first round opponent of Boise State. After the win against Boise State, Stanford hit the road and traveled to Wichita, Kansas to face the Shockers and would come out with a 70–56 victory. With the Semifinals being reseeded, the Cardinal would face Pac-10 foe, for the fourth time in the season, Oregon State. Stanford took Oregon State to overtime, but came up short losing by three, going 1–3 against the Beavers in the season and finishing 20–14 overall and 6–12 in conference play.

Offseason

Departures

Incoming

Transfers In

Roster

Schedule and results

|-
!colspan=12 style=| Exhibition

|-
!colspan=12 style=| Non-conference regular season

|-
!colspan=12 style=| Pac-10 regular season

|-
!colspan=12 style=| Pac-10 tournament

Source:

References 

Stanford Cardinal men's basketball seasons
Stanford
Stanford Card
Stanford Card